The San Francisco Mile Stakes is a Grade III American Thoroughbred horse race for horses age three and older over a distance of one mile (8 furlongs) on the turf held annually in April at Golden Gate Fields in Berkeley, California.

History

The race was inaugurated on 2 October 1948 as the Golden Gate Mile and held on the dirt track. The event was won by Prevaricator who was entered as an entry with the 1948 American Champion Older Dirt Male Horse Shannon II in equal world record time of 1:34 equaling Equipoise record from 1932.

The 1955 event was won by the 1954 Kentucky Derby winner Determine, who won by a neck defeating Santa Anita Handicap winners Rejected and Irish bred Poona II who finished second in a dead heat. The brilliant Californian horse Native Diver raced in the event four times winning it twice in 1963 and 1967 as an eight-year-old.

In 1956, the event was renamed to the San Francisco Mile Handicap

The event was run on the turf in 1953 but was not regularly scheduled again until 1972.

The event was classified as a Grade III in 1987 and a Grade II between 1994–2010.

The only mare to win this event was the French-bred mare Tuzla in 1999.

Between 2001 and 2005 the event was held at Bay Meadows Racetrack. Since the 2006 the event has been run as San Francisco Mile Stakes. Between 1999 and 2006 the event had additional Breeders' Cup incentives.

The event has been split into divisions four times - 1964, 1966, 1972, 1984.

Records 

Speed record: 
 1 mile (turf) – 1:33.40   Don Alberto (1980)
 1 mile (dirt) – 1:33.60  Citation (1950)

Margin 
 6 lengths  Gamin (ARG) (1966)

Most wins
 2 – Battle Ground (1957, 1958)
 2 – Native Diver (1963, 1967)
 2 – Alert Bay (2016, 2017)

Most wins by a jockey:
 3 – Ralph Neves (1952, 1956, 1964)
 3 – Bill Shoemaker (1953, 1960, 1963)

Most wins by a trainer:
 5 – Julio C. Canani (1989, 1990, 1999, 2000, 2006)

Winners 

Legend:

 
 

Notes:

§ Ran as part of an entry  

† Filly or Mare

‡ Fleet Bird was disqualified and placed 3rd for interference. Goose Khan was promoted to first place.

See also
 List of American and Canadian Graded races

References

Horse races in California
Golden Gate Fields
Graded stakes races in the United States
Open mile category horse races
Turf races in the United States
Grade 3 stakes races in the United States
Recurring sporting events established in 1948
1948 establishments in California